DRH may refer to:

Places
Dabra Airport (IATA code), Dabra, Indonesia
Detroit Receiving Hospital, Detroit, Michigan
Durham Regional Hospital, northern Durham, North Carolina

People
D. Richard Hipp (b. 1961), primary author of SQLite
Douglas Richard Hofstadter (b. 1945), American professor of cognitive science